Heini Hald (born 4 January 1942) is a Danish footballer. He played in two matches for the Denmark national football team in 1965.

References

External links
 

1942 births
Living people
Danish men's footballers
Denmark international footballers
Place of birth missing (living people)
Association footballers not categorized by position